The 1964 NCAA University Division Cross Country Championships were the 26th annual cross country meet to determine the team and individual national champions of men's collegiate cross country running in the United States. 

Held on November 23, 1964, the meet was hosted by Michigan State University at the Forest Akers East Golf Course in East Lansing, Michigan. This was the final race hosted by Michigan State after 25 straight years. The distance for this race was 4 miles (6.4 kilometers). This was the final meet held at this distance. Starting in 1965, the race was extended to 6 miles. 

All NCAA University Division members were eligible to qualify for the meet. In total, 23 teams and 180 individual runners contested this championship.

The team national championship was won by the Western Michigan Broncos, their first team title. The individual championship was won by Elmore Banton, from Ohio, with a time of 20:07.50.

Men's title
Distance: 4 miles (6.4 kilometers)

Team Result (Top 10)

See also
NCAA Men's College Division Cross Country Championship

References
 

NCAA Cross Country Championships
NCAA University Division Cross Country Championships
NCAA University Division Cross Country Championships
NCAA University Division Cross Country Championships 
Sports competitions in East Lansing, Michigan
Track and field in Michigan
Michigan State University